Halton is a surname. Notable people with the surname include:

 Albert Halton (1893–1971), English soldier, recipient of the Victoria Cross
 Anthony Halton, a fictional character in 1937 film Angel
 Brian Halton (1941–2019), New Zealand organic chemist
 Charles Halton (1876–1959), American film actor
 Charles Halton (public servant) (1932–2013), Australian public servant
 David Halton (born 1940), Canadian reporter of CBC News
 Immanuel Halton (1628–1699), English astronomer and mathematician
 Jane Halton (born 1960), Australian public servant
 John de Halton also called John de Halghton (died 1324), English priest, Bishop of Carlisle 1292–1324
 John Halton (1491–1527/1530), English Member of Parliament
 Kathleen Tynan,  (1937–1995), Canadian-British journalist, author and screenwriter
Mary Halton (1878–1948), American physician and early IUD researcher.
 Matthew Halton (1904–1956), Canadian television journalist
 P. W. Halton (1841–1909), Irish-born conductor and music director of D'Oyly Carte Opera Company
 Paul Halton, Royal Navy admiral
 Reg Halton (1916–1988), English footballer
 Sean Halton (born 1987), American professional baseball player
 Timothy Halton (1632?–1704), English churchman and academic

References